Route 126 is a highway located entirely within Barton County in the U.S. state of Missouri.  Its western terminus is at the Kansas state line, where K-126 ends. The route goes in a straight line for most of its length, and intersects Interstate 49 (I-49) and U.S. Route 71 (US 71). Its eastern terminus is at US 160 and Route 37 in Golden City. The route was designated in 1942, and formerly consisted of two supplemental routes.

Route description
Route 126 starts at the Kansas state line, where K-126 ends. The road travels east for around seven miles in a straight line, intersecting Route M and Route 43. Route 126 continues eastward, crossing through farmland and a few trees. After the route intersects Route J, it meets a frontage road parallel to I-49/US 71. The road crosses over North Fork Spring River and continues east. Soon, Route 126 intersects I-49/US 71 at a diamond interchange, and intersects a frontage road again. The route crosses a railroad owned by Missouri and Northern Arkansas Railroad, and intersects Routes JJ and T. Four miles later, the route enters Golden City and becomes Main Street. It becomes concurrent with Route 37. The routes goes through downtown Golden City, and turn slightly northeast. The two routes end at US 160 at a T-intersection. US 160 continues eastward toward Lockwood. In 2012, Missouri Department of Transportation (MoDOT) calculated as many as 840 vehicles traveling east of I-49/US 71, and as few as 480 vehicles traveling west of I-49/US 71. This is expressed in terms of annual average daily traffic (AADT), a measure of traffic volume for any average day of the year.

History
The road that became Route 126 was built and designated, as supplemental Route D around 1935. It connected from US 71 to US 160 in Golden City. By 1940, supplemental Route H was designated, connected from Route 43, to a dead end east of it. A year later, Route H was extended west to the Kansas state line. In 1942, Route 126 was designated, replacing Route H from the state line to Route 43. Around 1945-1949, Route H was extended east to Route Z, and the same route was extended east for a few miles east of Route Z in 1954. Around 1955, Route H and D were removed in the supplemental route system, and was replaced by Route 126, as the two sections became connected. Later, Route 126 was repaved in concrete, from the state line to Route 43. The whole route was repaved by 1957. In 1979, US 71 was moved to a freeway alignment, but an interchange wasn't built until 2010-2013. I-49 became co-signed with US 71 in December 2012.

Major intersections

References

126
Transportation in Barton County, Missouri